The 2019 PSL Beach Volleyball Challenge Cup was the second conference of the Philippine Super Liga's seventh season. It was held at the Capitol Resort Hotel, Maniboc, Lingayen, Pangasinan from May 16–18, 2019.

Women's

Preliminary round

Pool A

Pool B

Pool C

Pool D

Playoffs

Quarterfinals

For 7th place

For 5th place

For 3rd place

Women's Finals

Final standing

Men's

Preliminary round

Pool A

Pool B

Playoffs

Semi-finals

For 3rd place

Men's Finals

Final standing

Celebrity match

Team Amanda (AMA):
 Amanda Villanueva
 Apple David
 Margo Midwinter
 Aly Borromeo

Team Rachel (RAC):
 Rachel Anne Daquis
 Jinri Park
 Anton del Rosario
 Francoise "DJ Laboching" Fainsan

|}

Venue
 Capitol Resort Hotel, Maniboc, Lingayen, Pangasinan

Broadcast partner
 ESPN 5

References

Beach Volleyball
Beach volleyball competitions in the Philippines
PSL
May 2019 sports events in the Philippines